Fardella may refer to:
Fardella, Basilicata, an Italian municipality
Vincenzo Fardella di Torrearsa, President of the Italian Senate 1870-1874
Michelangelo Fardella (1646-1718), Italian philosopher